David McGillivray (born 7 September 1947 in London) is an actor, producer, playwright, screenwriter and film critic.

On the BBC Radio 3 discussion programme Free Thinking on 10 February 2015, writer and broadcaster Matthew Sweet described McGillivray as "The Truffaut of Smut", leading to McGillivray later commenting via his Twitter feed @makeadelivery, "I can die happy".

Originally a critic for Monthly Film Bulletin, McGillivray wrote his first film script, Albert's Follies, for friend Ray Selfe in 1973. Intended as a vehicle for The Goodies, who turned it down, the film was eventually released as White Cargo (1973) and starred a young David Jason in one of his earliest leading roles.

McGillivray was soon involved in the British sex film industry, writing scripts for The Hot Girls (1974) and I'm Not Feeling Myself Tonight (1976), two films produced by pornographer John Jesnor Lindsay. As would be the case with many of his films, McGillivray makes cameo appearances in both: in I’m Not Feeling Myself Tonight he is “Man at Party” who pulls Monika Ringwald’s dress off while in The Hot Girls he was given the job of doing an onscreen interview with Danish actress Helli Louise, who according to the synopsis in Cinema X magazine, talks to him about "working on a movie, and telling a few facts of life about screen nudity and enacting lesbian love scenes."

Horror
McGillivray gained attention with his scripts for the horror films of Norman J. Warren and especially Pete Walker. McGillivray wrote two scripts for Warren (Satan's Slave, Terror) and four for Walker (Frightmare, House of Whipcord, House of Mortal Sin, Schizo). The films were not commercially successful and McGillivray's scripts attracted mostly hostile reviews.

House of Whipcord did receive one or two positive reviews, with Films and Filming commenting: “Shows that something worthwhile in the entertainment-horror market can be done for the tiny sum of £60,000”. It was memorably dismissed by Russell Davies writing in British newspaper The Observer as a "feeble fladge fantasy” and described by the Evening News “as nasty an exploitation of sadism as I can recall in the cinema.”

Indeed, McGillivray's background as a critic for Monthly Film Bulletin and Time Out hardly excluded his writing efforts from the savage criticism of ex-colleagues. For example, a Films Illustrated review of I'm Not Feeling Myself Tonight lamented that "It is depressing to see David McGillivray writing scripts like this," while a Time Out review of Satan's Slave opens with: “Another absolute stinker from the withered pen of David McGillivray.”

In 1975 McGillivray was interviewed for an edition of the BBC programme Man Alive, dealing with sexploitation films, along with Walker, Bachoo Sen and Kent Walton. However, he later felt that he and his fellow contributors had presented a distorted view of the business, telling Screen International magazine in the same year "thrilled to bits that our opinions were held to be important enough for transmission we had all -may we be forgiven- said what the nations moral reformers wanted to hear i.e. that the films we made degraded us and that we were thoroughly miserable that the public didn't want to see anything more uplifting. This is not the case. I have never worked with anyone who found it unpleasant or distasteful to do a job which involved standing in close proximity to naked women.”

From 2004 he wrote and produced a series of short horror films, which were not particularly successful either on their own or when joined together as a portmanteau "Worst Fears", in which he also appeared as an actor. "Worst Fears" was shown at the Derby Film Festival in 2017 along with his short film Trouser Bar.

Theatre and comedy
 
With the abolition of the Eady levy tax in the early 1980s spelling the end for low-budget British sex comedies and horror films, McGillivray moved into the theatre, co-writing lowbrow farces for his own company. Working in collaboration with Walter Zerlin Jnr, a series of 10 plays focused on The Farndale Avenue Housing Estate Townswomens Guild Dramatic Society spoofed local amateur dramatic productions. The plays are published by Samuel French Ltd and continue to be performed in front of astonished audiences.

During this period he also met the performer Julian Clary, who was then starting as a stand-up comic. McGillivray has continued to this day to write for Clary, but claims that his are the jokes that "don't get laughs". His work has included writing material for Clary when he presented the BBC TV quiz show Come and Have A Go... in 2005, directing and co-writing Clary's 2009 national UK tour "Lord of the Mince", and directing and co-writing Julian Clary's 2012–14 tour "Position Vacant, Apply Within".

As an actor, he appeared with Olegar Fedoro in a new production of the Russian Futurist opera "Victory Over the Sun" presented by the New Factory of the Eccentric Actor at Pushkin House, London in December 2008.

McGillivray financed and produced Trouser Bar, the award-winning 2016 British erotic comedy/fantasy film directed by Kristen Bjorn, photographed by Sam Hardy, edited by Esteban Requejo, and intended for a mainstream audience. Focusing on a single "situation" in a menswear boutique in 1976, the short film has been described as an “erotic fantasy" in the style of a 1970s British sex comedy and does not include hardcore scenes. Released in 2017, the film played film festivals around the world.

Books
In 1992 McGillivray wrote the book Doing Rude Things, which documented the British sex film genre from its nudist camp beginnings to its demise in the video-era. Pamela Green wrote the foreword. In it McGillivray admits to a fondness for "the second rate and the downright worthless".

A television version of his original Doing Rude Things book was produced by the BBC in 1995, in which he was interviewed along with the likes of Donovan Winter, and Pamela Green. McGillivray has subsequently appeared in several similar documentaries. He also edited Scapegoat (1995), a one-shot anti-censorship magazine produced during the second "video nasty" furore of the early 1990s.

A vastly expanded and updated 25th anniversary edition of this 'seminal history' of the British sex film was published in October 2017 by Wolfbait Books, an imprint of Korero Press. The new edition is twice as long as the original, with 150 additional film titles added. The launch took place at a central London venue close to the main locations of Michael Powell's notorious 1960 film Peeping Tom. McGillivray has said that the new edition appeared to a "lukewarm response".

His autobiography, "Little Did You Know", was published by FAB Press in 2019.

Filmography

References

Sources
 Keeping the British End Up: Four Decades of Saucy Cinema by Simon Sheridan (third edition) (2007) (Reynolds & Hearn Books)
 Doing Rude Things: The History of the British Sex Film by David McGillivray (Wolfbait Books, 2017)
 Cinema X magazine, 1975, Vol 6. No 7. "The Hot Girls"
 Nekrofile: Cinema of the Extreme by Alan Jones (contains the 1975 Screen International quotes), Midnight Media publishing, 1997.

External links

Worst Fears website
David McGillivray podcast

Living people
English film directors
English film producers
English screenwriters
English male screenwriters
1947 births